New Adventures are an indie rock band originating from London. Their sound is compared often to the likes of Arcade Fire, Radiohead and Keane. The band consists of Jez Dixon (lead vocals), Steve Hurdle (guitar, backing vocals), Raph Knapp (bass guitar, backing vocals), Helen Fisher (keyboards, backing vocals) and Nick Eburah (drums and percussion).

Most of the band's members were previously in the band Fans of Kate. The band's debut single "How I Got My Devil Back (part one)" was described by Drowned in Sound as "soaring indie-rock schlock at its most overblown and ‘epic’", while The Skinny commented on the similarity to Snow Patrol, calling the single "an outrageously blatant bit of bandwagon jumping". The follow-up, "In Our Hands", was received more positively, with one reviewer describing it as "a big, urgent rock song that feels custom-made to win over the masses on national radio", and another as "a euphoric anthem in waiting".

Discography

EPs
 "Accidents"

Singles
 "How I Got My Devil Back (part one)" (2008), Faded Grandeur
 "In Our Hands"

References

External links
 

English rock music groups
Musical groups established in 2006
Musical groups from London
British indie rock groups